The 7th/11th Hussars was a light cavalry regiment and later light armoured regiment of the Non-Permanent Active Militia of the Canadian Militia (now the Canadian Army). The regiment was formed in 1936 by the amalgamation of the 7th Hussars and the 11th Hussars from the Eastern Townships of Quebec. In 1965, the regiment was amalgamated with The Sherbrooke Regiment (RCAC) to form The Sherbrooke Hussars.

Lineage

7th/11th Hussars 

 Originated on 21 September 1866 in Sherbrooke, Quebec as the Sherbrooke Battalion of Infantry.
 Redesignated on 15 March 1867 as the 53rd Sherbrooke Battalion of Infantry.
 Reorganized on 22 March 1867 as two separate battalions: the 54th Sherbrooke Battalion of Infantry (later The Sherbrooke Regiment) and the 53rd Melbourne Battalion of Infantry.
 Redesignated on 10 May 1867 as the 54th Richmond Battalion of Infantry.
 Redesignated on 8 May 1900 as the 54th Richmond Regiment.
 Converted to cavalry on 1 August 1903 and redesignated as the 11th Hussars.
 Amalgamated on 1 April 1936 with the 7th Hussars and redesignated as the 7th/11th Hussars.
 Redesignated on 27 February 1941 as the 2nd (Reserve) Regiment, 7th/11th Hussars.
 Redesignated on 1 April 1941 as the 16th (Reserve) Armoured Regiment, (7th/11th Hussars).
 Redesignated on 1 April 1946 as the 16th Reconnaissance Regiment (7th/11th Hussars), RCAC.
 Redesignated on 4 February 1949 as the 7th/11th Hussars (16th Reconnaissance Regiment).
 Redesignated on 1 September 1954 as the 7th/11th Hussars (16th Armoured Regiment).
 Redesignated on 19 May 1958 as the 7th/11th Hussars.
 Amalgamated on 15 February 1965 with The Sherbrooke Regiment (RCAC) and redesignated as The Sherbrooke Hussars.

7th Hussars 

 Originated on 11 October 1867 in Robinson, Quebec, as the 58th Compton Battalion of Infantry.
 Redesignated on 8 May 1900 as the 58th Compton Regiment.
 Converted to cavalry on 1 May 1903 and redesignated as the 7th Hussars.
 Amalgamated on 1 April 1936 with the 11th Hussars and redesignated as the 7th/11th Hussars.

Perpetuations 

 5th Battalion, Canadian Mounted Rifles, CEF

The Eastern Townships Mounted Rifles were first granted the perpetuation of the 5th Canadian Mounted Rifles after the First World War. After the regiment was converted to artillery in 1936, the perpetuation was passed onto the 7th/11th Hussars.

Organization

7th/11th Hussars (1 April 1936) 

 Regimental Headquarters (Bury, Quebec)
 HQ Squadron (Cookshire, Quebec)
 A Squadron (Danville, Quebec)
 B Squadron (Richmond, Quebec)
 C Squadron (Bishopton, Quebec)

Alliances 

 7th Queen's Own Hussars (1936–1958)
 The Queen's Own Hussars (1958–1965)

Battle Honours

Great War 

 Mount Sorrel
 Somme, 1916
 Flers–Courcelette
 Ancre Heights
 Arras, 1917, '18
 Vimy, 1917
 Hill 70
 Ypres, 1917
 Passchendaele
 Amiens
 Scarpe, 1918
 Hindenburg Line
 Canal du Nord
 Cambrai, 1918
 Valenciennes
 Sambre
 France and Flanders 1915–18

Second World War 

 Honorary distinction: badge of The Royal Rifles of Canada with year-dates "1941" was awarded as an honorary distinction for significantly reinforcing the Royal Rifles of Canada during their deployment with C Force to Hong Kong.

Notable members 

 Edson Warner

References 

Sherbrooke Hussars
Military units and formations of Quebec
Military units and formations disestablished in 1936